Liliana Teresa Zurowski (born 22 April 1956) is an Austrian handball player.  

She competed at the 1992 Summer Olympics, where Austria placed 5th.

References

1956 births
Living people

Austrian female handball players
Olympic handball players of Austria
Handball players at the 1992 Summer Olympics